Brandon Augustus Deaderick (born August 19, 1987) is a former American football defensive end. He was drafted by the New England Patriots in the seventh round of the 2010 NFL Draft. He played college football at Alabama.

High school career
Deaderick attended Elizabethtown High School in Elizabethtown, Kentucky. As a junior, he had 95 tackles and 22 sacks, earning all-state honors. As a senior, he missed four games to injury but averaged ten tackles per game and recorded seven sacks on the season. He also led EHS to their first state championship game in 24 years.

College career
Following high school, Deaderick attended the University of Alabama, where he redshirted in his first season in 2005. As a freshman in 2006, Deaderick played in seven games, finishing with two tackles. In 2007, Deaderick appeared in all 13 games and made seven starts, recording 22 tackles and two sacks. As a junior in 2008, he started 14 games at defensive end and finished the season with 36 tackles and four sacks.

In 2009, Deaderick was shot in the forearm during a robbery attempt he witnessed the week before the Chick-fil-A Kickoff Game. He wasn't seriously injured in the incident, he would be medically cleared to play later in the week and subsequently play in the 2009 opener. Alabama finished the 2009 season 14-0 beating Texas 37-21 in the 2010 BCS National Championship game. He finished his senior season with 23 tackles and one sack.

Professional career

New England Patriots
Deaderick was drafted by the New England Patriots in the seventh round (247th overall) of the 2010 NFL Draft. He signed a four-year contract on July 9, 2010. As a rookie, Deaderick received his first career start in Week 6 against the Baltimore Ravens, recording his first career sack. He went on to start three of the next four games for the Patriots, but was a healthy inactive for the team's Thanksgiving game in Week 12 against the Detroit Lions. After playing in the next three games as a reserve, Deaderick missed the team's Week 16 game with an injury but was a healthy scratch for the regular season finale. He finished the regular season with 10 tackles and 2.0 sacks in 10 games played (four starts). On January 3, 2011, during the Patriots' playoffs bye week, Deaderick was suspended by the team. His suspension was lifted on January 7, 2011.

Deaderick played 10 games in the 2011 regular season with 17 tackles and 2 sacks. He also started in Super Bowl XLVI, where the Patriots eventually lost to the New York Giants 21–17.

Deaderick played 14 games in the 2012 regular season with 18 tackles, 1 sack, and 2 forced fumbles. He was released by the Patriots on May 13, 2013.

Jacksonville Jaguars
Deaderick was claimed off waivers by the Jacksonville Jaguars on May 14, 2013. He was placed on injured reserve on December 23, 2013.

New Orleans Saints
On June 3, 2014, he signed a one-year contract with the New Orleans Saints.

Houston Texans
Deadrick signed with the Houston Texans in June 2015 but was cut from training camp on September 4, 2015.

Buffalo Bills
On August 15, 2016, Deaderick was signed by the Bills. On September 2, 2016, he was released by the Bills as part of final roster cuts.

References

External links
New England Patriots bio
Alabama Crimson Tide bio

1987 births
Living people
People from Elizabethtown, Kentucky
Players of American football from Kentucky
American football defensive ends
American football defensive tackles
Alabama Crimson Tide football players
New England Patriots players
Jacksonville Jaguars players
New Orleans Saints players
Houston Texans players
Buffalo Bills players